Umar al-Zaydani (died 1706) was the multazem (tax farmer) of Safad and Tiberias, and surrounding villages, between 1697 and 1706 and the sanjak-bey (district governor) of Safad between 1701 and 1706. He was appointed by the governor of Sidon, Arslan Mehmed Pasha, the sanjak-bey (district governor) of Safad. Umar belonged to the Zayadina, an Arab clan that was part of the same Qaisi confederation as the semi-autonomous Shihab emirs (princes) of Mount Lebanon. Following Emir Mansour's death, Umar succeeded him as sanjak-bey. Umar was the father of Zahir al-Umar.

References

Bibliography

1706 deaths
17th-century people from the Ottoman Empire
18th-century people from the Ottoman Empire
Ottoman rulers of Galilee
People from Arraba, Israel
Omar
17th-century Arabs